"URL Badman" is a song by English singer Lily Allen, released on 13 July 2014 as the fourth single from her third studio album, Sheezus (2014). The B-side to the single, "Bass Like Home", is an unofficial World Cup song for the UK.

Composition
"URL Badman" is a dubstep and synth-pop song, with Allen rapping over "a surprisingly hip-hop beat". In the song, there is an introduction. A dialogue between a boy named Alexander and his mother. Alex is in the room passing a prank on the internet when Alex's mother calls him for dinner. The main theme of the song is the Internet, and the criticisers from blogs who "spend their life on the computer". Allen said she wrote the song after a blogger criticised the music video for "Hard out Here" because it used mostly black dancers. Joe Bishop, the song's subject, said in an opinion piece for The Guardian that his "first reaction was to feel flattered".

Release 
"URL Badman" was released on 13 July 2014 by Parlophone. The B-side "Bass Like Home" contains her singing about the UK. "Bass Like Home" is not available in the US.

Live performances 
Allen performed the song on 24 May 2014 at the BBC Radio 1's Big Weekend, after "Littlest Things" and before "Our Time".

Track listing 
 Digital download
 "URL Badman" – 3:39
 "Sheezus" (Redlight Deconstructed Mix) – 4:37
 "Bass Like Home" (Lily Allen & Kid Harpoon) – 3:59

Chart performance 
"URL Badman" peaked at number 93 on the UK Singles Chart

Charts

References 

2014 songs
2014 singles
Lily Allen songs
Songs written by Lily Allen
Songs written by Greg Kurstin
Song recordings produced by Greg Kurstin
Parlophone singles